The Canadian Champion Two-Year-Old Colt is a  Canadian Thoroughbred horse racing honour. Created in 1975 by the Jockey Club of Canada, it is part of the Sovereign Awards program and is awarded annually to the top 2-Year-Old male Thoroughbred horse competing in Canada.

Past winners

1975 : Proud Tobin
1976 : Sound Reason
1977 : Overskate
1978 : Medaille d'Or
1979 : Allan Blue
1980 : Bayford
1981 : Deputy Minister
1982 : Sunny's Halo
1983 : Prince Avatar
1984 : Dauphin Fabuleux
1985 : Grey Classic
1986 : Blue Finn
1987 : Regal Classic
1988 : Mercedes Won
1989 : Sky Classic
1990 : Rainbows For Life
1991 : Free at Last
1992 : Truth of It All
1993 : Comet Shine
1994 : Talkin Man
1995 : Gomtuu
1996 : Cash Deposit
1997 : Dawson's Legacy
1998 : Riddell's Creek
1999 : Exciting Story
2000 : Highland Legacy
2001 : Rare Friends
2002 : Added Edge
2003 : Judiths Wild Rush
2004 : Wholelottabourbon
2005 : Edenwold
2006 : Leonnatus Anteas
2007 : Kodiak Kowboy
2008 : Mine That Bird
2009 : Hollinger
2010 : Madman Diaries
2011 : Maritimer
2012 : Uncaptured
2013 : Go Greeley
2014 : Conquest Typhoon
2015 : Riker
2016 : King and His Court
2017 : Admiralty Pier
2018 : Avie’s Flatter
2019 : Mr. Hustle
2020 : Gretzky The Great

References
The Sovereign Awards at the Jockey Club of Canada website

Sovereign Award winners
Horse racing awards
Horse racing in Canada